Michael Reginald Dilley is an English former cricketer active from 1957 to 1963 who played for Northamptonshire (Northants). He was born in Rushden, Northamptonshire on 28 March 1939. He appeared in 33 first-class matches as a righthanded batsman who bowled right arm fast medium. He scored 232 runs with a highest score of 31 not out and took 80 wickets with a best performance of six for 74.

Notes

1939 births
English cricketers
Northamptonshire cricketers
People from Rushden
Living people